is a former Japanese football player. He is the current phyisical coach J2 League club of Omiya Ardija.

Playing career
Okamoto was born in Kanagawa Prefecture on December 5, 1973. After graduating from Nihon University, he joined Japan Football League club NTT Kanto (later Omiya Ardija) in 1996. He became a regular player as left side back from first season. The club was promoted to J2 League from 1999. From his first season in 1996, he played in all matches until end of 2001 season except for one game for suspension in August 2001. However his opportunity to play decreased in 2003 and retired end of 2003 season.

Club statistics

References

External links

1973 births
Living people
Nihon University alumni
Association football people from Kanagawa Prefecture
Japanese footballers
J2 League players
Japan Football League (1992–1998) players
Omiya Ardija players
Association football defenders